Torup Parish is a parish in the Diocese of Helsingør in Halsnæs Municipality, Denmark. The parish contains the town of Hundested and the village of Torup.

References 

Halsnæs Municipality
Parishes of Denmark